Siddharth Kak is an Indian documentary maker, television producer, and presenter, best known as the producer and presenter of Surabhi (1990–2001). Subsequently, Kak established the 'Surabhi Foundation' with the assistance of Ford Foundation and started a project on preserving cultural artefacts.

Early life
He was educated at Lawrence School, Sanawar and subsequently graduated from St. Stephen's College, Delhi.

Career
Siddharth Kak currently hosts the Travel Show "Indiadhanush" on NDTV Imagine with Ami Trivedi, a popular Gujarati drama artist.

Personal life
He was married to actress Gita Siddharth until her death in 2019. Their daughter, Antara Kak, is a documentary filmmaker.

Filmography

As an actor

As an actor on TV

Works
 Looking in, looking out. Writers Workshop, 1975. .
 Surabhi Ke Sau Sawaal. Rupa & Co. 2005. .

References

External links
 

Year of birth missing (living people)
Living people
Indian documentary filmmakers
Lawrence School, Sanawar alumni
St. Stephen's College, Delhi alumni
Indian television producers
Film producers from Delhi
Indian television presenters
Place of birth missing (living people)